The 2012 Women's World Snooker Championship was a women's snooker tournament that took place at the Cambridge Snooker Centre in April 2012. The event was the 2012 edition of the World Women's Snooker Championship first held in 1976. It was won by England's Reanne Evans, who defeated Maria Catalano 5–3 in the final to win her eighth consecutive world title. Evans took the fifth frame with a break of 50 and then won the sixth to lead 4–2. Catalano made a 48 break in reducing her deficit to 3–4, but then Evans, who had recently started playing again after three months suffering from pleurisy, took the last frame and the title. Evans received £400 prize money as champion.

Twenty-four players competed in four Round Robin groups to determine the sixteen players for the knockout stages. Emma Bonney was the only player to win all fifteen frames in her group matches. The highest break of the tournament was a 116 compiled by Catalano in the first frame of her semi-final match.

Prize Fund

Winner: £400
Runner-up: £225
Semi-finals: £120
Quarter-finals: £80
Last 16: £40

Knockout stage

Players listed in bold indicate match winner.

Final

References 

World Ladies Snooker Championship
World Ladies Championship
World Snooker Championship
World Ladies Snooker Championship
International sports competitions hosted by England
World Women's Snooker Championship